Francesco Mussoni (born 15 May 1971) is a Sammarinese politician and was a Captain Regent of San Marino together with Stefano Palmieri from 1 October 2009 to 1 April 2010 and a second time together with Giacomo Simoncini from 1 October 2021 to 1 April 2022.

Career 
Mussoni as a member of the Sammarinese Christian Democratic Party (PDCS), was in the Grand and General Council from 2001 to 2006 and since November 2008. During his second tenure in office he has become a group leader for the PDCS.

Mussoni is a lawyer (avvocato e notaio). He had studied law at the University of Bologna.

Honours

Foreign honours 
  : Grand Cross of the Order of Saint-Charles (5 March 2010)

References

1971 births
Captains Regent of San Marino
Living people
University of Bologna alumni
People from the City of San Marino
Members of the Grand and General Council
Sammarinese Christian Democratic Party politicians
Sammarinese lawyers
Grand Crosses of the Order of Saint-Charles